The 1970 Nova Scotia general election was held on 13 October 1970 to elect members of the 50th House of Assembly of the Province of Nova Scotia, Canada. The Liberal Party of Gerald Regan won the most seats but were one seat short of a majority. It is the only election in Nova Scotia's history in which the party who won the popular vote did not win the most seats.

Results

Results by party

Results by region

Retiring incumbents
Progressive Conservative
Edward Haliburton, Kings South
James McKay Harding, Shelburne
James A. Langille, Cumberland East
William F. MacKinnon, Antigonish
Donald C. MacNeil, Cape Breton South
Edward Manson, Cape Breton West
John I. Marshall, Annapolis East
Robert Baden Powell, Digby
Harley J. Spence, Lunenburg West

Nominated candidates
Legend
bold denotes party leader
† denotes an incumbent who is not running for re-election or was defeated in nomination contest

Valley

|-
|bgcolor=whitesmoke|Annapolis East
||
|Gerry Sheehy2,83654.36%
|
|Lloyd K. Hill2,38145.64%
|
|
|
| 
||
|John I. Marshall†
|-
|bgcolor=whitesmoke|Annapolis West
|
|H. Robert Sanford2,04846.03%
||
|Peter M. Nicholson2,40153.97%
|
|
|
|
||
|Peter M. Nicholson
|-
|bgcolor=whitesmoke|Clare
|
|Paul J. Comeau1,83340.33%
||
|Benoit Comeau2,71259.67%
|
|
|
|
||
|Benoit Comeau
|-
|bgcolor=whitesmoke|Digby
|
|Gifford W. Lewis2,14242.46%
||
|Joseph H. Casey2,90357.54%
|
|
|
|
||
|Robert Baden Powell†
|-
|bgcolor=whitesmoke|Hants West
|
|Norman T. Spence3,70848.27%
||
|Robert D. Lindsay3,97451.73%
|
|
|
|
||
|Norman T. Spence
|-
|bgcolor=whitesmoke|Kings North
||
|Victor Thorpe3,23451.24%
|
|Glenn Ells3,07748.76%
|
|
|
|
||
|Victor Thorpe
|-
|bgcolor=whitesmoke|Kings South
||
|Harry How2,72257.55%
|
|Ed Aston2,00842.45%
|
|
|
|
||
|Edward Haliburton†
|-
|bgcolor=whitesmoke|Kings West
||
|Gordon Tidman3,73648.96%
|
|Frank Bezanson3,73548.95%
|
|
|
|Francis Keith Boates1602.10%
||
|Gordon Tidman
|}

South Shore

|-
|bgcolor=whitesmoke|Lunenburg Centre
|
|George O. Lohnes4,04045.43%
||
|Walton Cook4,85254.57%
|
|
|
|
||
|George O. Lohnes
|-
|bgcolor=whitesmoke|Lunenburg East
||
|Maurice L. Zinck2,09251.31%
|
|Eric Hagen1,98548.69%
|
|
|
|
||
|Maurice L. Zinck
|-
|bgcolor=whitesmoke|Lunenburg West
|
|Bob Levy2,71746.82%
||
|Maurice DeLory3,08653.18%
|
|
|
|
||
|Harley J. Spence†
|-
|bgcolor=whitesmoke|Queens
||
|W. S. Kennedy Jones3,06851.99%
|
|Harley Umphrey2,83348.01%
|
|
|
|
||
|W. S. Kennedy Jones
|-
|bgcolor=whitesmoke|Shelburne
|
|Bill Cox3,32143.74%
||
|Harold Huskilson3,72549.06%
|
|Aubrey Harding5477.20%
|
|
||
|James McKay Harding†
|-
|rowspan=2 bgcolor=whitesmoke|Yarmouth 
|
|Benoit Robichaud4,89625.16%
||
|Fraser Mooney5,03925.90%
|
|
|
| 
||
|Benoit Robichaud
|-
||
|George A. Snow4,92925.33%
|
|Jack Rogers4,59223.60%
|
|
|
|
||
|George A. Snow
|}

Fundy-Northeast

|-
|rowspan=2 bgcolor=whitesmoke|Colchester
||
|Gerald Ritcey8,01224.56%
|
|Ross Hill7,31322.42%
|
|
|
|
||
|Gerald Ritcey
|-
||
|George Isaac Smith9,39828.81%
|
|George Norrie7,90124.22%
|
|
|
|
||
|George Isaac Smith 
|-
|bgcolor=whitesmoke|Cumberland Centre
||
|Raymond M. Smith2,22054.87%
|
|Bill H. Mont1,61139.82%
|
|John E. Burbine2155.31%
|
|
||
|Raymond M. Smith
|-
|bgcolor=whitesmoke|Cumberland East
||
|Roger Stuart Bacon4,35551.89%
|
|Leonard J. Dolan3,14237.44%
|
|James M. MacSwain89510.66%
|
|
||
|James A. Langille†
|-
|bgcolor=whitesmoke|Cumberland West
||
|D. L. George Henley2,45857.35%
|
|Thomas H. Tonner1,82842.65%
|
|
|
|
||
|D. L. George Henley
|-
|bgcolor=whitesmoke|Hants East
|
|Albert J. Ettinger2,79347.27%
||
|Jack Hawkins3,11552.73%
|
|
|
|
||
|Albert J. Ettinger
|}

Halifax/Dartmouth/Eastern Shore

|-
|bgcolor=whitesmoke|Halifax Atlantic
||
|John Buchanan5,28454.66%
|
|Bob Hayes3,78639.16%
|
|Charles Grineault5976.18%
|
|
||
|John Buchanan
|-
|bgcolor=whitesmoke|Halifax Chebucto
|
|James H. Vaughan4,01538.34%
||
|James L. Connolly5,27650.39%
|
|Burris Devanney1,18011.27%
|
|
||
|James H. Vaughan
|-
|bgcolor=whitesmoke|Halifax Citadel
|
|Donald MacKeen Smith3,83345.60%
||
|Ronald Wallace4,57254.40%
|
|
|
|
||
|Donald MacKeen Smith 
|-
|bgcolor=whitesmoke|Halifax Cobequid
|
|Gordon H. Fitzgerald5,42742.69%
||
|George Riley6,45350.76%
|
|Bruno Dombrowski8336.55%
|
|
||
|Gordon H. Fitzgerald
|-
|bgcolor=whitesmoke|Halifax Cornwallis
|
|Richard Donahoe3,89139.27%
||
|George M. Mitchell5,32353.72%
|
|Barrett D. Halderman6947.00%
|
|
||
|Richard Donahoe
|-
|bgcolor=whitesmoke|Halifax Eastern Shore
|
|Murray Everett Ritcey4,02941.91%
||
|Alexander Garnet Brown5,58558.09%
|
|
|
|
||
|Alexander Garnet Brown
|-
|bgcolor=whitesmoke|Halifax Needham
|
|David MacKeen2,88737.05%
||
|Gerald Regan4,51457.92%
|
|Al Sinclair3925.03%
|
|
||
|Gerald Regan
|-
|bgcolor=whitesmoke|Halifax-St. Margaret's
|
|D. C. McNeil4,72939.74%
||
|Leonard L. Pace6,15251.69%
|
|Keith Jobson1,0208.57%
|
|
||
|D. C. McNeil
|-
|bgcolor=whitesmoke|Dartmouth North
|
|Gerald G. Wambolt4,82639.59%
||
|Glen M. Bagnell6,61454.26%
|
|Percy William Dares7506.15%
|
|
||
|Gerald G. Wambolt
|-
|bgcolor=whitesmoke|Dartmouth South
|
|Irvin William Akerley5,21349.57%
||
|D. Scott MacNutt5,30450.43%
|
|
|
|
||
|Irvin William Akerley 
|}

Central Nova

|-
|bgcolor=whitesmoke|Antigonish 
|
|Bill Shaw3,59445.72%
||
|Bill Gillis4,00250.91%
|
|Alex MacPherson2653.37%
|
|
||
|William F. MacKinnon†
|-
|bgcolor=whitesmoke|Guysborough
||
|Angus MacIsaac3,03547.86%
|
|Russell Pellerin2,77043.68%
|
|Al Newell5378.47%
|
|
||
|Angus MacIsaac
|-
|bgcolor=whitesmoke|Pictou Centre
|
|Donald R. MacLeod4,92243.75%
||
|Ralph F. Fiske5,35647.61%
|
|Derrick Peter Kearley9728.64%
|
|
||
|Donald R. MacLeod
|-
|bgcolor=whitesmoke|Pictou East
|
|Thomas MacQueen2,98147.18%
||
|A. Lloyd MacDonald3,00047.48%
|
|Charles E. Arbuckle3385.35%
|
|
||
|Thomas MacQueen
|-
|bgcolor=whitesmoke|Pictou West
||
|Harvey Veniot2,72951.00%
|
|Laurence Mawhinney2,00837.53%
|
|Robert Cormier61411.47%
|
|
||
|Harvey Veniot
|}

Cape Breton

|-
|bgcolor=whitesmoke|Cape Breton Centre
||
|Mike Laffin3,68050.54%
|
|Stewart Marsh1,90226.12%
|
|Alex MacDonald1,70023.35%
|
|
||
|Mike Laffin
|-
|bgcolor=whitesmoke|Cape Breton East
|
|Layton Fergusson3,80734.06%
|
|Bob MacKay2,03718.22%
||
|Jeremy Akerman5,33447.72%
|
|
||
|Layton Fergusson
|-
|bgcolor=whitesmoke|Cape Breton North
||
|Tom MacKeough5,75550.04%
|
|Sidney Oram2,88525.09%
|
|Len J. Arsenault2,86024.87%
|
|
||
|Tom MacKeough
|-
|bgcolor=whitesmoke|Cape Breton Nova
|
|Percy Gaum2,86642.45%
|
|Ronald DiPenta95914.20%
||
|Paul MacEwan2,92743.35%
|
|
||
|Percy Gaum
|-
|bgcolor=whitesmoke|Cape Breton South
||
|John Francis Burke5,23444.36%
|
|Vince MacLean5,03442.66%
|
|Don MacPherson1,53112.98%
|
|
||
|Donald C. MacNeil†
|-
|bgcolor=whitesmoke|Cape Breton West
|
|Kenneth Andrews4,84349.08%
||
|Allan Sullivan5,02450.92%
|
|
|
|
||
|Edward Manson†
|-
|rowspan=2 bgcolor=whitesmoke|Inverness
||
|Norman J. MacLean4,60725.23%
|
|William N. MacLean3,93921.57%
|
|Jerry Yetman5563.05%
|
|Al Davis1,3047.14%
||
|Norman J. MacLean
|-
|
|Joe Shannon3,72820.42%
||
|John Archie MacKenzie4,12422.59%
|
|
|
|
||
|William N. MacLean
|-
|bgcolor=whitesmoke|Richmond
||
|Gerald Doucet3,43955.67%
|
|Melvin J. Burt2,41139.03%
|
|Charles Joseph Gallant3275.29%
|
|
||
|Gerald Doucet
|-
|bgcolor=whitesmoke|Victoria
||
|Fisher Hudson2,07552.53%
|
|W. Harry F. Langley1,70043.04%
|
|Jessie Stone1754.43%
|
|
||
|Fisher Hudson
|}

References

Further reading
 

1970
1970 elections in Canada
1970 in Nova Scotia
October 1970 events in Canada